Destiny of Spirits was a free-to-play online social strategy game with role-playing elements for the PlayStation Vita, developed jointly by Japan Studio and Q Entertainment for Sony Computer Entertainment. The game was divided into three online regions, Asia, the Americas, and Europe, each with a separate server. The game's servers were closed down on June 30, 2015, following an announcement made a few months prior.

Development
The game was announced during a pre-E3 live show in 2013. The worldwide closed beta test for the game took place during October 2013, when codes were handed out to subscribers of PlayStation Plus. Following the closure of the test, improvements were made to the game and shortcomings identified by players were addressed. The game is available in Japanese, English, and Traditional Chinese.

The game features special collaboration spirits, including Kat from Gravity Rush, and Sony mascot Toro. The game features voice acting from Kana Hanazawa and president of SCE Worldwide Studios Shuhei Yoshida. Artists involved in creating the spirit art for the game include Shunsuke Saito and VOFAN.

In March 2015, Sony announced that the game would no longer be available for both new players and existing players on June 30, 2015. While not providing reasons regarding the cancellation of the game, Sony had revealed that the game had been downloaded by more than 1 million people.

Gameplay
The game is based on collecting and summoning legendary spirits and using them to battle against enemies in a turn-based combat system, in cooperation with other players. The player may select attacks to choose from, or let the system automatically decide on attacks; enemy weaknesses are affected by elemental attacks. As a location-based game, it uses the player's real-world location to determine the spirits the player is able to attain, based on the mythology of the local surroundings where the player resides. Players are able to summon Japanese youkai and shinto gods, Chinese mythological beasts, Native American folktale creatures, European spiritual figures, deities from ancient Egyptian and Mayan civilizations, and other various categories depending on their circumstances, with each spirit represented by a two-dimensional sprite created by various different artists.

Spirits may be merged to create stronger spirits or rented from other players using spirit points, whilst summoning spirits requires the use of summoning stones. The game offers the optional choice of purchasing Destiny Orbs using real-life money via the PlayStation Network, which grants the ability to perform advanced summons.

References

External links
Official website (Japan)
Official information site (English)

2014 video games
PlayStation Vita games
PlayStation Vita-only games
PlayStation Network games
Strategy video games
Role-playing video games
Video games developed in Japan
Free-to-play video games
Video games based on multiple mythologies